The 2016 African Volleyball Championship U21 was held in Casablanca, Morocco from 22 to 23 September 2016. The champions of the tournament qualified for the 2017 FIVB Volleyball Men's U21 World Championship.

Egypt finished the 2-team best-of-three tournament on top of the standing to clinch their fourth title.

Qualification
2 CAVB under-21 national teams have registered to participate in the 2016 African Championship U21.

 (Hosts)

Squads

Best of three

|}

Final standing

References

External links
African Volleyball Confederation – official website

African Volleyball Championship U21
Volleyball Championship U21
2016 in Moroccan sport
International volleyball competitions hosted by Morocco
September 2016 sports events in Africa